Shijian (abbr. "SJ") is a series of satellites built and operated by the People's Republic of China. Some Shijian-series satellites have drawn significant concerns from the United States government and space observers who cite unannounced launches, undisclosed sub-satellites deployed in orbit, unusual orbital maneuvers, and demonstrated rendezvous proximity operations (RPO) including the close inspection and towing of other satellites.

Little is known about the series and what differentiates it from other experimental satellite series launched by China such as the Chuangxin series or Shiyan series. The China Aerospace Studies Institute of the United States Air Force asserts that Shiyan-series satellites play an earlier role in the systems development process testing various new technologies on a single bus while Shijan-series satellites are used to develop operational best practices and optimize the technologies previously tested on Shiyan-series satellites. In this regard "Shijian" should be translated as "best practice", or "put into practice" while "Shiyan" ought to be translated as "experiment", "pilot", or "trial".

Notable satellites

Shijian-17 
In a April 2021 written statement to the US Senate Armed Services Committee, General James H. Dickinson, Commander of United States Space Command (USSPACECOM) was the first US official to speak publicly on Shijian-17 warning of its counterspace capabilities. General Dickinson wrote "Beijing actively seeks space superiority through space and space attack systems. One notable object is the Shijian-17, a Chinese satellite with a robotic arm. Space-based robotic arm technology could be used in a future system for grappling other satellites." Shijian-17's robotic arm also earned mention in the United States Department of Defense 2022 China Military Power Report.

Shijian-17 has also prompted concern among observers who have tracked Shijian-17's unique orbital maneuvers. Since its launch, Shijian-17 has occupied a wide span of orbital positions within its geostationary orbit to dynamically adjust its position relative to neighboring satellites. These varied positions have ranged from 37.7°E over Africa to 180°E over the Marshall Islands, uncharacteristic of other satellites designed for communications. Shijian-17 has also positioned itself as close as 55 kilometers to other satellites for periods of a week or more while other geostationary satellites maintain an average 207-kilometer separation distance.

Shijian-18 
Shijian-18 was a Chinese communications and technology demonstration satellite developed and launched by the China Academy of Space Technology on 2 July 2017. It was the maidan flight of the DHF-5 satellite bus, which is designed with 16-year lifespan. Shijian-18 carried 18 experiments on board involving communications and space telescopes. It was lost after a malfunction on the Long March 5 rocket carrying the satellite. It would have been the heaviest geostationary satellite at the time of its launch, with a launch mass of 7,600 kg (16,800 lb). The satellite incorporated a high-thrust ion propulsion system, a large trussed structure and a higher payload capacity. More specifically, it used the LIPS-300 xenon thruster for orbit keeping, developed by the Lanzhou Institute of Physics. It was planned for the LIPS-300 system to be fully certified in this mission so that it could be used for geostationary and deep-space operations. The satellite would operate at the Ka band with 70 Gb/s capacity, capable of providing broadband internet to whole mainland China.

Shijian-18 launched from the Wenchang Space Launch Site on 2 July 2017 at 11:23 UTC on board a Long March 5 rocket to a geostationary orbit. It was the rocket's second flight, the first being to launch Shijian-17. The rocket encountered an anomaly shortly after launch, causing it to switch into a gentler trajectory. However, 45 minutes into the flight, it was declared a failure, with the loss of the payload. The cause of the failure was later determined to be a faulty oxidizer turbopump, which has now been redesigned twice. The rocket and payload crashed in the Pacific Ocean somewhere at the Philippine Sea.

Shijian-21 
In October 2021, China launched Shijian 21 (SJ-21) from Xichang Space Launch Center (XSLC) aboard a Long March 3B rocket into geosynchronous transfer orbit (GTO). Atypically, China issued no notifications prior to the launch confirming only after the satellite's successful launch. China's official state news media organization, Xinhua News Agency, described SJ-21 as a On-Orbit Service, Assembly, and Manufacturing (OSAM) satellite that would be "mainly used to test and verify space debris mitigation technologies." A month after its launch, SJ-21 drew some suspicion from space observers as an object, described to be an undeclared sub-satellite, began orbiting closely alongside SJ-21 shortly after its entry into geosynchronous orbit (GEO). The object was initially cataloged as a apogee kick motor (AKM) by the US Space Force's 18th Space Defense Squadron (SDS), however many doubt that a discarded motor would maintain the constant and proximate orbit with SJ-21 instead of gradually drifting away. SJ-21 drew further suspicion in January 2022 when, according to commercial space monitoring firm ExoAnalytic Solutions, SJ-21 went "missing" from its orbital slot to dock with defunct Beidou G2 (Compass G2) navigation satellite capitalizing on the inability of optical satellites to track space-objects during the day. Shijian-21 then moved to an orbit 3,000 kilometers higher where it released the Beidou G2 satellite into graveyard orbit and returned to GEO.

Many observers suspect the spacecraft, like many of China's Yaogan and Gaofen satellites, serve primarily military purposes under the cover of more mundane missions. With SJ-21's demonstrate capability to tug satellites from their orbit and China's increasing interest in space power, the spacecraft likely also offers the Chinese government a tool for counterspace operations. Victoria Samson, the Washington Office director for the Secure World Foundation said "You could look at China working to develop the capability to remove inactive satellites on orbit as a way in which it is being a responsible space actor and cleaning up debris that it caused. Or you could use the lens that a lot of the US-based China watchers use and say that this could indicate that China is developing an on-orbit offensive capability." Samson also praised commercial space situational awareness (SSA) providers for presenting the public and academia with satellite tracking capabilities previously exclusive to government. China received criticism for its lack of transparency on Shijian-21's operations.

Satellites

See also 

 Yaogan
 Gaofen
 Fengyun

References 

Satellite series
Spacecraft launched by Long March rockets
Satellites of China